Aethapsis is an actinolepid placoderm known from two species, A. major and A. utahensis.

Placoderms of North America
Placoderms
Paleontology in Utah
Paleontology in Ohio